Antonio Vagnozzi (born 1950) is an amateur Italian astronomer and a discoverer of asteroids.

Astronomical career 
Vagnozzi is credited by the Minor Planet Center (MPC) with the discovery of 46 minor planets during 1993–1999. In 1993, he was Italy's first amateur astronomer (and the second discoverer worldwide) to discover a minor planet using a CCD camera. (The first numbered CCD-based discovery was 4255 Spacewatch, which was discovered by the Spacewatch project in 1986).

He also searches for supernovae and is a co-discoverer of SN 1996ae.

Awards and honors 

The main-belt asteroid 7529 Vagnozzi was named in his honor. The official naming citation was published by the MPC on 11 April 1998.

List of discovered minor planets

See also 
 
 Santa Lucia Stroncone Astronomical Observatory

References 
 

1950 births
20th-century Italian astronomers
Discoverers of asteroids

Living people